Ingrid dela Paz  (born April 10, 1994) is a Filipina actress with Spanish and Filipino descent. She was a former Star Magic artist.  Ingrid made her first on-screen appearance in an episode of Maalaala Mo Kaya. 

She appeared on a number of television shows and first came to public attention for appearing in ABS-CBN's 2013 Philippine romantic comedy television series, Got to Believe directed by Cathy Garcia-Molina as Patricia. It was starred by Daniel Padilla and Kathryn Bernardo.  The series was aired on ABS-CBN and worldwide on The Filipino Channel from August 26, 2013 to March 7, 2014.

Early life
Ingrid dela Paz was born and raised in a Catholic family. She is the second of four children and has three siblings. On her mother’s side, Ingrid is of Spanish descent of Malaga, Spain,  from the line of Don Sixto dela Camara tracing back to 18th century Spanish colonist in the Philippines, and said to have an indigenous great grandfather, named Ricardo “Datu Mabalao” dela Camara, the “Overall Chieftain of Higaonon Tribe” in Mindanao.
 
Ingrid’s fortune wasn't handed to her on a silver platter as she was raised most of her life by a single mother. Ingrid didn’t have an easy time growing up, being fatherless brings its own set of difficulties and had a crucial developmental times during her younger years. She and her siblings were taught to be independent, tough and to take care of things on their own. However, her mother managed to send them in private school and provided them a spiritual loving household.

If ever there were proof that hard work and a good attitude can take you far, Ingrid would be it. Just after graduation from high school, she was fortunate to realize at an early age that no one is going to hand her dreams or what she need in life, and that she need to go out there and capture it herself. Ingrid had to struggle with two or three jobs to finance her studies and help her family. She modeled from promotional to fashions at local social events to support her studies in college. Her family was her rock and her foundation.

It was the hardship and challenges of her humble beginnings that turned out to be the driving force behind the realization of her dreams.

Modeling

As a professional model, Ingrid was first featured in Monday magazine's "Bureau Crazy" article in 2010, issue #1 & #2 . She began her modeling career by signing with modelling agency at age 16. She has done photo shoots with Kickers, Yamaha, Smart, and some distinguish photographers in Manila.

Ingrid first runway modelling stint was the Philippine Fashion Week Spring Summer in 2010, followed by Adidas Fashion Show, FG Wall Walk Fashion Show, My Philippines Fashion Show and Rue de Mirage Couture.

Filmography

Television

Film

References

Notes
  Star Magic introduces 'Star Magic Circle 2013'

External links
 
 
 

Star Magic
Living people
Filipino television actresses
Filipino people of Spanish descent
1994 births
Actresses from Manila